The Kirk of St Nicholas is a historic church located in the city centre of Aberdeen, Scotland. Up until the dissolution of the congregation on 31 December 2020, it was known as the "Kirk of St Nicholas Uniting". It is also known as "The Mither Kirk" (mother church) of the city. As of 1 January 2021, the building falls under the care and maintenance of the General Trustees of the Church of Scotland.

The church has a dark oak interior.

History

The earliest mention of a church on the site of the present Kirk can be found in a Papal document of 1151. Given Aberdeen's proximity to the sea, St Nicholas was chosen as the patron saint of Aberdeen, as a miracle attributed to him was the rescue of some sailors in a storm.

The Kirk was enlarged in the 15th century.  St Nicholas and St Mary's, Dundee, were probably the largest parish churches in medieval Scotland.  This work was dedicated by Bishop Elphinstone in 1498. The 500th anniversary of the dedication of the enlarged church was marked with the installation of a special stained glass window at the main entrance to the Kirk, overlooking Drum's Aisle.

The church contains the Drum Aisle (the ancient burial-place of the Irvines of Drum Castle) and the Collison Aisle, which divide the two congregations and which formed the transepts of the 12th-century church of St Nicholas (architectural detail survives from this period). The West Church was built between 1751 and 1755, to plans given to the burgh by James Gibbs, in the Italian style, on the site of the medieval nave, the East in 1834 in Gothic-revival style on the site of the choir. In 1874 a fire destroyed the East Church and the old central tower with its lead-clad timber spire and its fine peal of nine bells, one of which, Laurence or "Lowrie", was 4 ft (1.2 m) in diameter at the mouth, 3.5 ft (1.1 m) high and very thick. The church was rebuilt and a massive granite tower erected over the intervening aisles, a new carillon of 36 bells, cast in Belgium, being installed to commemorate the Victorian jubilee of 1887. Because the tuning of these bells by van Aerschot was not so good, the bells were replaced in 1950 with 48 bells made by Gillett & Johnston, it is now one of the largest carillons in the British Isles.

The building includes two sanctuaries under one roof (though only one is now used). Following considerable decay, the old nave collapsed in approximately 1742. A rebuilt church – known as the West Kirk – was built in 1755, by James Gibbs. This is still used for regular worship. The other section – the East Kirk – though it was still complete and retained a wooden medieval roof similar to that which survives at King's College Chapel], Old Aberdeen, was rebuilt in 1837, by Archibald Simpson, and had to be again rebuilt following a fire in 1874. Extensive renovation and archeological work is currently taking place in the East Kirk.  The foundations of earlier phases of the kirk, many medieval burials, and large numbers of architectural fragments are among the rich finds from this important site.

Despite the many alterations to the fabric of the Kirk over the year's, St Nicholas retains a larger number of medieval effigies than any other Scottish parish church, though none of these are in their original positions.  The Vault or Chapel of Our Lady of Pity survives under the east end of the Kirk.  It has been refaced externally, but retains its medieval vaults within.  A number of pieces of late medieval and 17th century woodwork are preserved in this vault.

The former Kirk of St Nicholas Parish is now incorporated into the Parish of St Mark's, also under the ministry of Interim Minister, The Revd Ian Murray.

Churchyard

The graveyard surrounds the church on three sides: north, south and west.

It is extremely crowded on the west and south sides. It has a high proportion of table stones.

It does not follow the standard Scottish pattern of stones generally facing east.

Close to the church on its south side a number of ground slabs now form part of paving, and are also used for car parking, a feature generally unseen in Scotland.

Monuments date from the mid 17th century.

The boundary onto Union Street was rebuilt as a very formal Georgian colonnade in the 19th century.

Notable burials

Alexander Anderson (Lord Provost of Aberdeen)
Sir John Anderson
John Henry Anderson Wizard of the North
Rev Dr Thomas Blackwell, principal of Marischal College
Sir Thomas Blaikie
Rev Prof William Laurence Brown (inside kirk)
John Burnett of Elrick
Rev Andrew Cant
William Cruden, twice provost of Aberdeen
John Cruickshank (mathematician)
William Cruickshank, twice Provost
George Davidson of Pettens
Robert Dyce
William Dyce memorialised on his parents' grave
Alexander Dingwall Fordyce
John Gibb (engineer)
George Russell Gowans RSW artist
Rev Dr William Guild
Gavin Hadden, four times Lord Provost
Prof Robert Hamilton
James Jopp five times Provost of Aberdeen
James Melvin Latin scholar
Andrew Moir (anatomist)
James Mowat of Logie (d.1662)
Cpt William Penny Arctic explorer
William Rickart
Archibald Simpson
George Skene, Provost of Aberdeen
John Smith (architect)
Gavin Turreff, author
Alexander Walker (d.1711) Provost 1697/8
John Webster Lord Provost 1856 to 1859 and MP for Aberdeen

Other memorials

 Plaque to Rev Alexander Hetherwick
 Plaque to Very Rev Mitford Mitchell minister from 1878 to 1895 and Moderator of the General Assembly

See also
 Action of Churches Together in Scotland

References

External links
Official website

Church of Scotland churches in Scotland
Churches in Aberdeen
Collegiate churches in Scotland
Category A listed buildings in Aberdeen
Listed churches in Scotland